Steve Weinstein (born 1964) is an American professional bridge and poker player. He is known best as the youngest winner of the ACBL Life Master Pairs and the most frequent winner of the  Cavendish Invitational Pairs, the world's leading contest for cash prizes. , the World Bridge Federation shows Weinstein at number 22 in the Open World Grand Masters rankings. His highest ranking was 16th, in October 2011.

Life
Weinstein was born in New York state in 1964. At the age of 17 in 1981 he became the youngest winner of any North American Bridge Championship, the ACBL's annual Life Master Pairs, playing with his stepfather Fred Stewart.

Weinstein and Liz Davis have been together since 1986, married since 1993. They live in Andes, New York.

Weinstein worked on Wall Street until 2002 when he became a full-time professional bridge and poker player. He played poker as 'Thorladen' and mentored others. "I take top young bridge players and I train them to be top poker players", he told Online Poker in 2007. One of them was Gavin Wolpert; in 2010 Wolpert and another player created Bridge Winners, an online news and networking site for bridge players, which Weinstein immediately joined.

Bridge career
Ten years after the Life Master Pairs championship, Stewart–Weinstein were one-third of a team (USA2) that represented the U.S. in the world championship for national teams, the 1991 Bermuda Bowl, where they reached the quarterfinal. They won the Cavendish Pairs in 1993 and again in 1996.

Weinstein's regular partner for more than a decade is Bobby Levin, who may still be known best as the youngest winner of a world teams championship, the 1981 Bermuda Bowl. When forming their partnership, they spent a week with Marty Bergen in Florida to put together their system.

Levin–Weinstein have won the Cavendish Pairs five times from 1999. In the WBF World Championships Open Pairs they finished 11th in 2002, second in 2006, and first in 2010.

They were one-third of USA1 in the 2011 Bermuda Bowl, where they finished fourth. Beginning mid-2012 they joined Nick Nickell's team. The professional teams hired by Nickell had won four of the preceding nine biennial Bermuda Bowls, from 1995.

Bridge accomplishments

Awards
 ACBL King of Bridge, 1982
 ACBL Player of the Year, 1995

Wins
 World Bridge Championships (2)
  
Rosenblum Cup 2022
World Open Pairs 2010

 European Open Bridge Championships (1)
 Mixed Teams (1) 2003

 Other notable wins:
 Pan American Open Teams (1) 1992
 Sunday Times–Macallan Invitational Pairs (1) 1993

 North American Bridge Championships
 Vanderbilt (4) 2009, 2011, 2014, 2017
 Reisinger (1) 1984
 Open Board-a-Match Teams (2) 1995, 2006
 Jacoby Open Swiss Teams (3) 1992, 2005, 2006
 Roth Open Swiss Teams (1) 2010
 Blue Ribbon Pairs (1) 1987, 2013
 Life Master Pairs (2) 1981, 2001
 Open Pairs II (1) 1995
 IMP Pairs (1) 2003
Norman Kay Platinum Pairs (1) 2018
 United States Bridge Championships
  Open Team Trials (3) 2010, 2014, 2017 
 Other notable wins:
 Buffett Cup (2) 2006, 2010
 Cavendish Invitational Teams (3) 1999, 2005, 2008
 Cavendish Invitational Pairs (7) 1993, 1996, 1999, 2002, 2007, 2009, 2010

Runners-up

 World Open Pairs (1) 2006
 North American Bridge Championships (12) 
 Vanderbilt (4) 2000, 2010, 2018, 2019
 Grand National Teams (1) 1991
 Open Swiss Teams (1) 2008
 Blue Ribbon Pairs (3) 1994, 2000, 2004
 Life Master Open Pairs (1) 2002
 Open Pairs II (1) 1999
 Von Zedtwitz Life Master Pairs (1) 2022
 Other notable 2nd places:
 Cavendish Invitational Teams (3) 2000, 2006, 2009
 Cavendish Invitational Pairs (3) 1986, 1998, 2011

Notes

References

External links
 
 Steve 'Thorladen' Weinstein search results at Card Player: the poker authority

1964 births
American contract bridge players
Bermuda Bowl players
American poker players
Living people
People from Andes, New York